Aleksandr Panov, or Alexander Panov, may refer to:

 Aleksandr Panov (diplomat) (born 1944), Russian Ambassador and rector of the Diplomatic Academy of the MFA of Russia
 Aleksandr Panov (handballer) (born 1946), Soviet handballer
 Aleksandr Panov (footballer) (born 1975), Russian footballer
 Aleksandr Panov (animator) for The Tale of Tsar Saltan (1984 film) and The Cat Who Walked by Herself